William Casper Seaman (January 19, 1925 – December 6, 1997) was an American photographer from Grand Island, Nebraska.

He won the 1959 Pulitzer Prize for Photography citing "Wheels of Death", a "dramatic photograph of the sudden death of a child in the street". He was photographer for the Minneapolis Star from 1945 to 1982.

He died in Minneapolis of natural causes.

References

1925 births
1997 deaths
20th-century American photographers
Artists from Minneapolis
Pulitzer Prize for Photography winners
Star Tribune people
20th-century American non-fiction writers
20th-century American businesspeople
People from Grand Island, Nebraska